Kenneth Beech (born 18 March 1958) is an English former footballer. A midfielder, he played for Port Vale between 1976 and 1981, picking up the club's Player of the Year award in 1980, also playing on loan at American club Cleveland Cobras in 1978. In 1981, he was sold to Walsall, before he moved on to Peterborough United two years later. He dropped into non-league football with Stafford Rangers in 1985, with whom he won the Conference League Cup, before he retired in 1988. He played 314 league games in the Football League, scoring 28 goals.

Career
Beech was signed to Third Division Port Vale as a youngster after impressing coach Reg Berks – this was despite Beech suffering from a broken leg at the time. He made his debut in the 1974–75 season under Roy Sproson. He played seven games in 1975–76, signing professional forms in January 1976, getting his first senior goal at Vale Park in a 1–1 draw with Halifax Town on 17 April. His early arrival at league level brought him England youth trials at Lilleshall and three weeks as a triallist with Manchester United.

Still a teenager, he played 35 games in 1976–77, scoring four goals, as the "Valiants" narrowly avoided relegation. He made another thirty appearances in 1977–78, scoring twice, as Vale suffered relegation under Bobby Smith. Beech went to the United States to play on loan for Cleveland Cobras from May to August in 1978. He returned to Burslem to score 4 goals in 24 games under Dennis Butler in the 1978–79 Fourth Division campaign. He scored four goals and made 49 appearances in 1979–80, keeping his first team place under the management merry-go-round that saw Dennis Butler, Alan Bloor, and then John McGrath take charge. For his performances, fans voted him Player of the Year. He posted another 52 appearances in 1980–81, scoring seven goals, as Vale again struggled near the foot of the Football League.

Beech was sold to Third Division Walsall for a £10,000 fee in August 1981. Under Neil Martin's stewardship, the "Saddlers" avoided relegation in 1981–82 after finishing ahead of Wimbledon on goal difference. Walsall improved under Alan Buckley in 1982–83, and finished in tenth place. With five goals in 79 league appearances for Walsall, Beech moved on to Fourth Division Peterborough United. "Posh" posted mid-table finishes under John Wile in 1983–84 and 1984–85. Beech scored five goals in sixty league games for the club.

Beech joined newly promoted Alliance Premier League side Stafford Rangers in 1985. Rangers finished seventh in 1985–86, and lifted the Conference League Cup after victory over Barnet in the final. They followed this with a thirteenth-place finish in 1986–87 and a sixth-place finish in 1987–88. Beech then retired from the game at age 30, to take up a job with Michelin in his native Stoke.

Career statistics

Honours
Individual
Port Vale F.C. Player of the Year: 1980

Stafford Rangers
Conference League Cup: 1986

References

Footballers from Stoke-on-Trent
English footballers
Association football midfielders
Port Vale F.C. players
English expatriate footballers
Cleveland Cobras players
Walsall F.C. players
Peterborough United F.C. players
Stafford Rangers F.C. players
English Football League players
American Soccer League (1933–1983) players
National League (English football) players
English expatriate sportspeople in the United States
Expatriate soccer players in the United States
1958 births
Living people